The Toy Association is an American trade association for the US toy industry.

Description 
The Toy Association leads the health and growth of the U.S. toy industry, which has an annual U.S. economic impact of $98.6 billion, and represents hundreds of companies including manufacturers, retailers, licensors, and others who are involved in the youth entertainment industry. Its manufacturing members account for 93% of U.S. toy and game sales driving the annual $38.2 billion U.S. domestic toy market. It was founded in 1915 by A. C. Gilbert, as the Toy Manufacturers of America, and he became its first president.

The average price of a toy is around $10, but the estimated 3 billion units sold across the United States each year generates approximately $32 billion in direct toy sales. From toy inventors to store clerks, the toy industry supports an estimated 626,936 jobs (FTE) generating more than $31.5 billion in wages for U.S. workers. The toy industry generates $13.3 billion in tax revenue each year.

The Toy Association produces Toy Fair New York, the largest toy show in the Western Hemisphere. Other initiatives include educating consumers on safe play via PlaySafe.org, advocating for strong legislation that will ban the sale of unsafe, counterfeit toys (among other issues of priority to toy companies), promoting the value of play through The Genius of Play, and delivering brand-new toys and games to children in underprivileged communities through its philanthropic arm, The Toy Foundation.

References

External links
 Official website

Trade associations based in the United States
Toy industry
Organizations established in 1916